Jean-Baptiste Moreau (c.1656 – 24 August 1733) was a French composer of the baroque period. He served as the master of music at the court of Louis XIV. His compositional output includes several motets and music for the theatre.

Life and career
Born in Angers, Moreau was a choirboy at the Cathédrale Saint-Maurice d'Angers, and it was there that he received his musical education. He worked in Langres and Dijon for short periods, before moving to Paris to become a court musician. He eventually was appointed master of music at the court and was awarded a pension from the king upon his retirement.  Moreau contributed original music to the premieres of the final two plays of Racine, Esther and Athalie. Moreau also composed musical interludes for Duche's Jonathas, Boyer's Jephte, Absalon, Debora and various divertissements.  He was also active as a teacher and counts among his pupils Louis-Nicolas Clérambault, Jean-François Dandrieu, and Michel Pignolet de Montéclair. He died in Paris.

References

External links

1650s births
1733 deaths
18th-century classical composers
18th-century French composers
18th-century French male musicians
French Baroque composers
French male classical composers
People from Angers
17th-century male musicians